Messapia is a former municipality in Euboea, Greece. Since the 2011 local government reform it is part of the municipality Dirfys-Messapia, of which it is a municipal unit. The municipal unit has an area of 433.26 km2. Its name derives from the ancient river Messapios, which runs in the middle of the island. Population 13,327 (2011). The seat of the municipality was in Psachna.

References

Populated places in Euboea